Quebe is a Chilean town.  It is a highland Aymara town. It is located in the commune of Colchane, Tarapacá Region, Chile. It is located 4004 meters above sea level.

References 

Populated places in Tarapacá Region
Communes of Chile